Henry Burk Jones (August 1, 1912 – May 17, 1999) was an American actor of stage, film, and television.

Early years
Jones was born in New Jersey, and was raised in Philadelphia, Pennsylvania. He was the son of Helen (née Burk) and John Francis Xavier Jones. He was the grandson of Pennsylvania Representative Henry Burk, a German immigrant. Jones attended the Jesuit Saint Joseph's Preparatory School.

Career
Early in his career, he performed with the Hedgerow Theatre near Philadelphia. His first Broadway appearance was in Maurice Evans's 1938 Hamlet. During World War II, he served in the army and was cast in Irving Berlin's This is the Army. 

Jones is remembered for his role as handyman Leroy Jessup in the movie The Bad Seed (1956), a role he originated on Broadway. Other theater credits included My Sister Eileen, The Time of Your Life, They Knew What They Wanted, The Solid Gold Cadillac, and Sunrise at Campobello, for which he won the Tony Award for Best Performance by a Featured Actor in a Play, and the Outer Critics Circle Award for Performance in a Drama. His last Broadway role was in Advise and Consent in 1960–1961.

Jones appeared in more than 180 films and television shows. His screen credits included The Girl Can't Help It with Jayne Mansfield, 3:10 to Yuma with Van Heflin, Will Success Spoil Rock Hunter? with Jayne Mansfield and Tony Randall, Alfred Hitchcock's Vertigo with James Stewart, Cash McCall with James Garner, The Bramble Bush with Richard Burton, Rascal with Bill Mumy, Butch Cassidy and the Sundance Kid with Paul Newman and Robert Redford, Dirty Dingus Magee with Frank Sinatra, Support Your Local Sheriff with James Garner and Walter Brennan, Support Your Local Gunfighter with James Garner, 9 to 5 with Dolly Parton and Lily Tomlin, and Arachnophobia with Jeff Daniels.

On television, Jones' best-remembered role was as the title character's father-in-law in the 1970s sitcom Phyllis. Jones portrayed Jed McCoy on a 1961 episode of the sitcom The Real McCoys. He had a regular role on the drama Channing, with Jason Evers.

Jones also appeared on Appointment with Adventure, Alfred Hitchcock Presents, The Investigators, The Eleventh Hour, Bewitched, Night Gallery, Emergency!, The Mod Squad, Daniel Boone with Fess Parker, Gunsmoke, The Twilight Zone, Thriller, Adam-12, The Doris Day Show, Father Knows Best, The Dukes of Hazzard, Flo, Magnum, P.I. with Tom Selleck, The Untouchables with Robert Stack, Hawkins with James Stewart,  Kolchak: The Night Stalker with Darren McGavin, MacGyver, Mr. Belvedere, The George Burns and Gracie Allen Show with Burns and Allen,The Mary Tyler Moore Show and Falcon Crest.

He played Dr. Smith's cousin in a 1966 episode of Lost in Space, "Curse of Cousin Smith", and with R.J. Hoferkamp in the 1968 made-for-television movie Something for a Lonely Man. In 1967, he guest-starred in the episode "A Time to Die" of the Sci-Fi TV show Voyage to the Bottom of the Sea. Starting in 1974, he guest-starred three times on The Six Million Dollar Man as Dr. Jeffrey/Chester Dolenz. This character was a brilliant scientist who built lifelike robots, but although every plot was foiled, he still managed to escape to fight another day. In 1978, he appeared in the Barney Miller episode "The Prisoner".

In the mid-1980s, Jones appeared at local dining theatre productions, including Winnipeg's Stage West.

Personal life and death
Jones was a Republican and supported the campaign of Dwight Eisenhower in the 1952 presidential election.

Jones died in UCLA Medical Center in Los Angeles, California, at age 86 from complications from injuries suffered in a fall at his home in Santa Monica, California.

Filmography

Film

Television

References

External links
 
 
 

1912 births
1999 deaths
20th-century American male actors
Accidental deaths from falls
Accidental deaths in California
American male film actors
American male stage actors
American male television actors
California Republicans
Male actors from Philadelphia
Male actors from Santa Monica, California
Pennsylvania Republicans
St. Joseph's Preparatory School alumni
Tony Award winners